People's Park is an urban public park in the city of Kashgar in Xinjiang Uyghur Autonomous Region, western China. The  park is one of the largest in Kashgar.

Located in the center of Kashgar, south of the People's Square, People's Park is one of the main recreational places in the city. The park's facilities include an artificial lake, pavilions, a Uyghur-style cultural palace, children's playgrounds, orchards, a zoo, and a rollerskating rink. Admission is free.

On the main thoroughfare outside People's Park stands a large statue of Mao Zedong, with a hand raised toward the park.

References

Parks in Xinjiang
Urban public parks
Tourist attractions in Xinjiang
Kashgar